Andreyevsky is a rural locality (a settlement) in Oktyabrsky Selsoviet, Zmeinogorsky District, Altai Krai, Russia. The population was 2 as of 2013. There is 1 street.

Geography 
Andreyevsky is located 96 km east of Zmeinogorsk (the district's administrative centre) by road. Bugryshikha is the nearest rural locality.

References 

Rural localities in Zmeinogorsky District